Spencer Enochs Torkelson (born August 26, 1999) is an American baseball first baseman and third baseman for the Detroit Tigers of Major League Baseball (MLB). Torkelson was selected first overall by the Tigers in the 2020 Major League Baseball draft.

Amateur career
Torkelson attended Casa Grande High School in Petaluma, California, where he played baseball, football and basketball. During his high school baseball career, he batted .430 with 11 home runs and 99 runs batted in (RBIs). He committed to Arizona State University (ASU) to play college baseball for the Arizona State Sun Devils.

As a freshman at Arizona State, Torkelson batted .320/.440/.743 with 25 home runs and 53 RBIs over 55 games. The 25 home runs led the nation, set a Pac-12 Conference record for home runs by a freshman, and also broke Barry Bonds' school record for home runs by a freshman. He was named the Collegiate Baseball Newspaper Freshman of the Year, National Collegiate Baseball Writers Association National Freshman Hitter of the Year and the Pac-12 Freshman of the Year. After the season, he played for the United States collegiate national team. As a sophomore, Torkelson joined Bob Horner as the only Arizona State players to hit 20 home runs for consecutive seasons. In 2019, Baseball America ranked Torkelson as the No. 1 college prospect in the 2020 draft. After the 2018 and 2019 seasons, he played collegiate summer baseball for the Chatham Anglers of the Cape Cod Baseball League. As a junior, Torkelson hit six home runs in a COVID-19 shortened season, giving him 53 for his ASU career, three shy of ASU's career record.

Professional career

Minor leagues
The Detroit Tigers selected Torkelson with the first overall pick in the 2020 Major League Baseball draft. On June 30, 2020, he signed with the Tigers for $8,416,300, the highest signing bonus awarded in MLB draft history. The same day, he was added to the Tigers' 60-man player pool.

To begin the 2021 season, Torkelson was assigned to the West Michigan Whitecaps of the High-A Central. After slashing .312/.440/.569 with five home runs and 28 RBIs over 31 games, he was promoted to the Erie SeaWolves of the Double-A Northeast in mid-June. That same month, he was selected to play in the All-Star Futures Game. Over fifty games with Erie, he batted .263 with 14 home runs and 36 RBIs. On August 15, he was promoted to the Toledo Mud Hens of Triple-A East, where finished the season and hit .238/.350/.481 with 11 home runs and 27 RBIs over 40 games. After the Triple-A season ended, he joined the Salt River Rafters of the Arizona Fall League.

Detroit Tigers
On April 2, 2022, the Tigers announced that Torkelson had made their Opening Day roster. His first major league hit was a double off Boston Red Sox pitcher Rich Hill on April 12. He hit his first major league home run off Red Sox pitcher Austin Davis on April 13. On July 17, the Tigers optioned Torkelson to AAA Toledo. At the time of the demotion, he was hitting .199 with 5 home runs. Torkelson returned to the Tigers as a September call-up.

References

External links

Arizona State Sun Devils bio
 

1999 births
Living people
People from Petaluma, California
Baseball players from California
Major League Baseball first basemen
Detroit Tigers players
Arizona State Sun Devils baseball players
Chatham Anglers players
West Michigan Whitecaps players
Erie SeaWolves players
Toledo Mud Hens players
Salt River Rafters players
United States national baseball team players